In enzymology, arginine kinase is an enzyme that catalyzes the chemical reaction

ATP + L-arginine  ADP + Nω-phospho-L-arginine

Thus, the two substrates of this enzyme are ATP and L-arginine, whereas its two products are ADP and Nω-phospho-L-arginine. Unlike the phosphoester bond, formed during the phosphorylation of serine, threonine or tyrosine residues, the phosphoramidate (P-N bond) in phospho-arginine is unstable at low pH (<8), making it difficult to detect with the traditional mass spectrometry protocols.

Arginine kinase belongs to the family of transferases, specifically those transferring phosphorus-containing groups (phosphotransferases) with a nitrogenous group as acceptor.  This enzyme participates in arginine and proline metabolism.

Nomenclature 

The systematic name of this enzyme class is
 ATP:L-arginine Nω-phosphotransferase
Other names in common use include
 arginine phosphokinase, 
 adenosine 5'-triphosphate: L-arginine phosphotransferase, 
 adenosine 5'-triphosphate-arginine phosphotransferase,
 ATP:L-arginine N-phosphotransferasel ATP:L-arginine, and 
 ω-N-phosphotransferase.

Function 
In Gram-positive bacteria, such as Bacillus subtilis, the arginine kinase McsB phosphorylates the arginine residues on incorrectly folded or aggregated proteins to target them for degradation by the bacterial protease ClpC-ClpP (ClpCP).The phospho-arginine (pArg) modification is recognised by the N-terminal domain of ClpC, the protein-unfolding subunit of the ClpCP protease. Following recognition, the target protein is degraded by the ClpP subunit which has protease activity. Since phosphorylation reverses arginine's charge, the pArg modification has an unfolding effect on the target protein, easing its proteolytic degradation. Arginine phosphorylation is a dynamic post-translational modification, which can also be reversed by pArg-specific phosphatases, such as the bacterial YwlE. The pArg-ClpCP mechanism for protein degradation in bacteria is analogous to the eukaryotic ubiquitin-proteasome system.

Several studies have reported the presence of arginine kinases in eukaryotes. A recent study identified arginine phosphorylation on 118 proteins in Jurkat cells, which were primarily proteins with DNA/RNA-binding activities. The function of arginine phosphorylation in eukaryotes however is still unknown.

Structural studies

References

Further reading 

 
 
 
 

EC 2.7.3
Enzymes of known structure